Aguadulce is a district (distrito) of Coclé Province in Panama. The population according to the 2000 census was 39,290.  The district covers a total area of 466 km². The capital lies at the city of Aguadulce.

Prominent families
Among the early families who settled within Aguadulce, adding significantly to the economy, were the Smiths and Sinclairs. English immigrants by way of Nicaragua, where the two patriarchs met, both friends settled in town, and married local women. 

Dr. E. Sinclair was among the first dentists in the area. He and his wife, Beva, had several children, all of whom went on to become professionals and remain in Panama serving the community.

Leopold Smith was the town's photo journalist, and came to the country originally to document the end construction process of the Panama Canal. He later settled in Aguadulce, having met Sara Ortega, and had five children. He became the town's portrait, newspaper, and crime scene photographer, while Sara opened the town's first convenience store, offering soft drinks, candies, and pastries. 

The Smiths' children, too, went on to become professionals; however, most settled in the United States. His son decided to remain in Panama and went on to become a child psychologist in Panama.

Both families have many grandchildren worldwide.

Administrative divisions
Aguadulce District is divided administratively into the following corregimientos: 

San Juan Bautista de Aguadulce (capital)
El Cristo
El Roble
Pocrí
Barrios Unidos

References

Districts of Coclé Province